Kevin Bludso (born 1965) is an American chef, restaurateur, and television personality.

Early life
Bludso was born in 1965 in Compton, California. His father was a police officer at the Los Angeles Police Department; his mother was a postal service worker. While on summer vacation, Bludso lived with his aunt, Willie Mae Fields, in Corsicana, Texas. Fields introduced him to Texas-style barbecue; at the age of 9 or 10, Bludso was allowed to help with the cooking. He studied business at the Dallas-based Bishop College.

Career
Prior to entering the food industry, Bludso worked as a correctional officer for some thirteen years. He opened Bludso's BBQ in 2008, serving as its pitmaster. Based in Compton, the restaurant shut down in September 2016, following a dispute with the landlord. Bludso also owns restaurants in Hollywood and Melbourne, Australia. In 2020, Bludso served as a judge on the Netflix series The American Barbecue Showdown.

Personal life
As of September 2020, Bludso resides in Texas. He is a fan of the Dallas Cowboys.

Restaurants owned by Bludso

United States

Australia

Television appearances

 Diners, Drive-Ins and Dives (2013)
 Bar Rescue (2015)(2021)
 Fire Masters (2019)
 BBQ Brawl (2019)
 The American Barbecue Showdown (2020)

References

External links
 

1965 births
American restaurateurs
American television chefs
American male chefs
Living people
American company founders
21st-century American businesspeople
Participants in American reality television series
Barbecue chefs
People from Compton, California
Chefs from Texas